Bae Seul-ki (born 9 June 1985) is a South Korean footballer who plays as centre back for Pohang Steelers.

Career
In 2008, Bae signed with Incheon Korail after graduating from Konkuk University.

After finishing his military service in Police FC, He joined Pohang Steelers.

References

External links 

Bae Seul-ki at steelers.co.kr

1985 births
Living people
Association football defenders
South Korean footballers
Daejeon Korail FC players
Pohang Steelers players
K League 1 players
Korea National League players
Konkuk University alumni